Juan Antonio Lavalleja (June 24, 1784 – October 22, 1853) was a Uruguayan revolutionary and political figure. He was born in Minas, nowadays being located in the Lavalleja Department, which was named after him.

Pre-Independence role

He led the group called "Thirty-Three Orientals" during Uruguay's Declaration of Independence from Brazil in 1825. His leadership of this group has taken on somewhat mythic proportions in popular Uruguayan historiography.

Post-Independence career

After Uruguay's independence in 1825, Lavalleja sought the presidency as a rival to Fructuoso Rivera in 1830, who won. In protest to his loss, Lavalleja staged revolts. He was part of a triumvirate chosen in 1852 to govern Uruguay, but died shortly after his accession to power.

Historical legacy

Lavalleja is remembered as a rebel who led the fight against Brazil. But as one of the major figures in early, post-independence Uruguayan history he is identified as a skilled but reactionary warrior who contributed to the culture of intermittent civil war which dogged Uruguay for much of the 19th century.

Family
Lavalleja married Ana Monterroso in 1817; she was sister of José Benito Monterroso.
Setembrino Pereda, La leyenda del arroyo Monzón, Lavalleja y Rivera. Montevideo: 1935.

See also

 Politics of Uruguay
 Treaty of Independence of Cisplatine in a new country, the Uruguay - 1828
 Republic
 History of all constitutions of Brazil

References

External links
 Biografía de Lavalleja - Biography
 Amérique Latine, Histoire & Mémoire - 15 | 2008 : Etat et Nation I (19e siècle) - Article about his
 Genealogy and Ancestry of Lavalleja
 Una flor blanca en el cardal - PerSe - A White Flower in a catholic religious. (The Book do mention to he)
 Political Office-Holders in Uruguay: Education and Culture Ministers of Uruguay, Foreign Ministers of Uruguay, Interior Ministers of Uruguay

1784 births
1853 deaths
People from Minas, Uruguay
People of the Cisplatine War
Uruguayan cattlemen
Foreign ministers of Uruguay
Uruguayan people of Basque descent
Thirty-Three Orientals
Burials at Montevideo Metropolitan Cathedral
19th-century Uruguayan people
Uruguayan National Army generals